Human = Garbage is the debut by American band Dystopia, released originally as a 12-inch EP through Life is Abuse, Common Cause, and Misanthropic Records. The record was later reissued on CD format containing an extra set of bonus tracks pulled from various split releases.

The five tracks from the original EP were recorded throughout February 1994, the first session starting at a mere three hours after bassist Todd Kiessling was bailed out of jail. According to Kiessling, he was arrested for trying to purchase an item with counterfeit money. He was, however, unaware of the currency's dubious status at the time of arrest. According to the liner notes of the CD edition of the record, all of the artwork was composed of various pictures and magazines that the band found in trash cans.

The CD edition of the album has been released on vinyl formats. In 2014, the album was pressed on double vinyl through Tankcrimes.

Track listing

Personnel
Todd Kiessling - bass
Dino Sommese - vocals, drums
Matt Parrilo - guitar, vocals, typography, artwork
Dan Kaufman - vocals (tracks 6 through 12)
Michael Nicoles - photography
Robert Vandoran - photography
Jim Barnes - production
Michael Perniski - typography
Vomit BDF - artwork, typography

External links

References

1994 debut albums
Dystopia (band) albums